Christiane Pooley (born 1983 in Temuco, Chile) is a Chilean visual artist. She lives and works in Paris.

After studying at the Pontifical Catholic University of Chile, she obtained her degree at the Chelsea College of Art and Design in London.

Pooley has developed a taste for researching and creating spaces in her paintings. In her exhibition Bordes del mundo she explores landscapes, both natural and human.

References

External links
Website

1983 births
Living people
21st-century Chilean women artists
People from Temuco
Chilean people of British descent
Pontifical Catholic University of Chile alumni
Alumni of Chelsea College of Arts